is the largest law firm in Osaka, Japan and 8th largest law firm in Japan.

After 10 years of relationship with China-based clients, Oh-Ebashi LPC & Partners was the first Japanese law firm to open an office abroad in Shanghai, China.

Although all three offices of Oh-Ebashi LPC & Partners are active in Corporate Legal Affairs, Individual Representation and Pro Bono Activities, Osaka-based M&A work concerning foreign and domestic companies remains a "core strength".

Development history 
(1974 April) Makoto Miyazaki founds 
(1980 April) Tadashi Ishikawa founds 
(1981 January) Ishikawa, Tsukamoto and Miyazaki together found 
(1983 January) Name officially changes to 
(1995 July) Opening of the Shanghai Office
(2002 August) Reorganized into a Legal Professional Corporation; name officially changes to the current 
(2002 September) Opening of the Tokyo Office

The main and largest office is in Kita-ku, Osaka. The Shanghai office opened in 1995, the Tōkyō office opened in 2002, and there is an office in Nagoya.

References

External links 
Official English Website
Official Japanese Website 
IFLR1000 Worldwide Law Firm Rankings

Law firms of Japan
Law firms established in 1981